Advanced airway management is the subset of airway management that involves advanced training, skill, and invasiveness. It encompasses various techniques performed to create an open or patent airway – a clear path between a patient's lungs and the outside world.

This is accomplished by clearing or preventing obstructions of airways. Obstructions can be caused by many things, including the patient's own tongue or other anatomical components of the airway, foreign bodies, excessive amounts of blood and body fluids, or aspiration of food particles.
  
Unlike basic airway management such as head tilt/chin lift or jaw-thrust maneuver, advanced airway management relies on the use of medical equipment and advanced training. Certain invasive airway management techniques can be performed "blind" or with visualization of the glottis. Visualization of the glottis can be accomplished either directly by using a laryngoscope blade or by utilizing newer video technology options.

In roughly increasing order of invasiveness are the use of supraglottic devices such as oropharyngeal (OPA), nasopharyngeal (NPA), and laryngeal mask airways (LMA). Laryngeal mask airways can even be used to deliver general anesthesia. These are followed by infraglottic techniques, such as tracheal intubation and finally surgical techniques.

Advanced airway management is a key component in cardiopulmonary resuscitation, anaesthesia, emergency medicine, and intensive care medicine. The A in the ABC initialism mnemonic for dealing with critically ill patients stands for airway management. Many airways are straightforward to manage. However, some can be challenging. Such difficulties can be predicted to some extent; a recent Cochrane systematic review examines the sensitivity and specificity of the various bedside tests commonly used to predict difficulty in airway management.

Pharnygeal airways 
Pharyngeal airway devices are used in spontaneously breathing patients to move the tongue away from the back of the throat to restore airway patency. Obstruction of the upper airway caused by the tongue most commonly occurs during times of decreased levels of consciousness. Pharyngeal airway devices include nasopharyngeal airways (NPAs) and oropharyngeal airways (OPAs). These devices are the simplest artificial airways.

Oropharyngeal airways 

An oropharyngeal airway (OPA) is a rigid tube that is inserted into the mouth through the oropharynx and placed above the tongue to move it away from the back of the throat. They are more commonly used than nasopharyngeal airways (NPAs). OPAs should only be used in profoundly unresponsive or unconscious patients without a gag reflex. Placement of the device may stimulate the gag reflex and cause vomiting, aspiration, and laryngospasm. Complications from OPA placement include damage to the teeth and the lingual nerve, which may cause changes in taste and sensation of the tongue.

Nasopharyngeal airways 

A nasopharyngeal airway (NPA) is a flexible tube that is passed through the nose into the back of the throat. They are the artificial airways of choice in patients who are conscious and have intact gag reflexes because they are less likely to stimulate the gag reflex than oropharyngeal airways (OPAs). NPAs can also be used in other sitations where OPAs cannot, such as in patients with restricted mouth opening or oral trauma. NPAs are generally not recommended if there is suspicion of a fracture to the base of the skull due to the risk of the tube entering the cranium. They are also contraindicated in the presence of significant facial trauma. Epistaxis is a complication of NPAs that may result from the use of excessive force during placement.

Extraglottic airways
Extraglottic airway devices (EGDs) create a patent airway without entering the trachea. These devices are highly effective for providing oxygenation and ventilation. They can be used as primary airway devices, such as during CPR, or as rescue devices in situations where securing an airway using other devices has failed. EGDs are especially good rescue devices for obese patients and patients with significant facial trauma. EGDs do not protect the trachea from obstruction or aspiration. They may be used for several hours until a definitive airway can be secured.

Each type of EGD has different features, including the ability to remove air from the stomach (gastric decompression) and perform tracheal intubation. All EGDs can be placed without directly seeing the glottis (also called "blind" placement). EGDs can be classified into supraglottic airways and retroglottic airways.

Supraglottic airways 
Supraglottic airway devices (SGAs) create a seal over the glottic opening to send oxygen directly into the trachea. The SGAs consist entirely of laryngeal masks. Several manufacturers produce these devices, the most well known being the laryngeal mask airway (LMA). Success rates of SGAs in securing airways are similar between the different models, and these devices provide effective ventilation in more than 98% of patients. SGAs can be placed in under 30 seconds, making them advantageous for emergency use. Serious complications are rare and usually result from nerve and soft tissue trauma in the pharynx during placement.

Retroglottic airways 
Retroglottic airway devices (RGAs) pass behind the glottis and into the esophagus to create a seal allowing oxygen to be delivered directly to the trachea. The RGAs are designed as laryngeal tubes. Examples of RGAs include the Combitube and The King LT. Studies comparing the effectiveness between the RGAs are lacking. Like SGAs, most complications from RGAs result from trauma to the pharynx during placement.

Tracheal intubation

Tracheal intubation, often simply referred to as intubation, is the placement of a flexible plastic or rubber tube into the trachea to maintain an open airway or to serve as a conduit through which to administer certain drugs. It is frequently performed in critically injured, ill or anesthetized patients to facilitate ventilation of the lungs, including mechanical ventilation, and to prevent the possibility of asphyxiation or airway obstruction. The most widely used route is orotracheal, in which an endotracheal tube is passed through the mouth and vocal apparatus into the trachea. In a nasotracheal procedure, an endotracheal tube is passed through the nose and vocal apparatus into the trachea.

Indications 
There are specific indications or guidelines for deciding a more invasive and more secure airway is worth the associated risk:
 respiratory failure
 apnea or the suspension of breathing
 decreased or altered level of consciousness, rapid mental status change, Glasgow Coma Scale score less than 8 (GCS<8).
 major trauma, such as penetrating injury to abdomen or chest
 direct airway injury or facial burns
 high risk of aspiration

Methods 

Classically tracheal intubation has been performed utilizing laryngoscopy to obtain direct visualization of the vocal cords. There are multiple different laryngoscope blade styles, shapes and lengths from which to choose. Multiple intubation tools are now available with built-in video technology. A Glidescope utilizes a laryngoscopic blade connected by a cable to a large video screen and requires a slightly different technique than that of a traditional laryngoscope. The McGrath model has a compact design with a smaller screen directly attached to the blade. Studies have shown that video laryngoscopes when compared to classic models resulted in fewer failed intubation attempts, especially in those patients designated as more difficult airways.

Confirming placement
The gold standard for confirming successful placement of an endotracheal tube is direct visualization of the tube passing through the vocal cords. Secondary methods of confirmation include capnography, oxygen saturation, chest x-ray, or equal chest rise and breath sounds heard on both sides of the chest.

Surgical airways

Surgical methods for airway management rely on making a surgical incision below the glottis in order to achieve direct access to the lower respiratory tract, bypassing the upper respiratory tract. Surgical airway management is performed as a last resort in cases where tracheal intubation has failed, is not feasible, or is contraindicated. Surgical methods for airway management include cricothyrotomy and tracheostomy.

A cricothyrotomy is a procedure during which an incision is made through the cricothyroid membrane, allowing an artificial airway to be placed in the trachea. It is the first-line surgical procedure to access an airway in an emergency because it can be performed more quickly than a tracheotomy and is less likely to cause bleeding and damage to thyroid tissue. A cricothyrotomy creates a temporary airway that can be used until a more definitive airway can be secured.

A tracheotomy is a surgical procedure creating an incision in the front of the neck down to the trachea. A tracheostomy tube can be placed through the opening created by the incision, which allows breathing through the tube rather than the nose and mouth. Although the terms are sometimes used interchangeably, a "tracheotomy" is the surgical procedure creating an incision into the trachea, while "tracheostomy" refers to the opening in the trachea created by the incision. The most common acute complications of a tracheotomy are difficulty speaking or swallowing due to nerve damage, prolonged bleeding at the incision site, and pneumothorax. A tracheotomy is rarely indicated in an emergent setting. It more commonly performed in a controlled environment to create an airway that can be used long-term, such as for prolonged mechanical ventilation.

Pediatric considerations

Children are not just small adults. They are unique in far more ways than simply being smaller in size. There are many basic differences in anatomy compared to adults that can affect airway management. For example, children's heads are proportionally larger in relation to their overall body size. This can cause alignment issues that have the potential to make it substantially more difficult to obtain good visualization of the appropriate airway landmarks. The differences in a child's anatomy can also affect equipment choices, such as choosing a straight laryngoscope blade instead of a curved one to achieve better control of a more elastic airway. Making the right equipment choices is so important that a color-coded tape measure (known as Broselow tape) was created to help facilitate rapid and accurate decisions in pediatric emergency situations. Birth complications, congenital syndromes (such as Down syndrome) and even recent illness or nasal congestion can affect how airway management is approached in a child.

When ventilation, various airway options and even intubation are unsuccessful, this is a terrifying situation known as "cannot ventilate, cannot intubate". Typically this is when a cricothyrotomy would be attempted as mentioned above. However, this tricky procedure is even more difficult in kids due to their extra flexible airways. The chance of accidentally puncturing all the way through the trachea to the esophagus increases substantially. The risk is considered so high that the procedure is contraindicated in children under the age of 5–6 years old.

See also
 Advanced life support
 Basic airway management

References

Medical procedures
Airway management